Chimene or Chimène Suleyman is a writer from London of Northern Cypriot descent, who has written on the politics of race and immigration in media including The Guardian, The Independent, the BBC and NPR, and co-edited The Good Immigrant USA in 2019.

Personal life
Suleyman was born in London, but her father's family are from Northern Cyprus. She has written about her grandfather's death in 1964, when he was tortured and killed by soldiers, and his body, with a dozen others, seen in a much-reproduced photograph.

Literary career
Along with Dylan Sage, Suleyman created the monthly spoken-word event "Kid, I Wrote Back" in London, which ran from  2010 until at least 2013.

In 2014, a writer on sexism called Laura Bates chose Suleyman's poetry collection  Outside Looking On as one of her "best books" of the year, saying that it "presents startlingly perceptive snapshots of human experience, delving powerfully into themes that range from big-city loneliness and longing, to prejudice and love".

In 2017, Suleyman was a contributor to the crowdfunded publication The Good Immigrant, and in 2019 contributed to and co-edited its sequel, The Good Immigrant USA.

In 2021, Suleyman, Monisha Rajesh and professor Sunny Singh criticised aspects of Kate Clanchy's Some Kids I Taught and What They Taught Me and the response to their criticism. Suleyman said: "Despite being accomplished writers and teachers on structural racism and colonialism, Professor Sunny Singh, author Monisha Rajesh, and myself became invisible to authors who endorsed this book, speaking only with white authors, whilst simultaneously expressing denigrating racially charged views of us."

Selected publications

References

21st-century British women writers
British people of Turkish Cypriot descent
British women non-fiction writers
Living people
Year of birth missing (living people)